Göynük is a village in the Çobanlar District, Afyonkarahisar Province, Turkey. Its population is 977 (2021).

References

Villages in Çobanlar District